OFX may refer to:

 OFX (company), the ASX trading code of the global payments company OzForex Group Limited
 Open Financial Exchange, a file format
 OpenFX (API), a standard for visual effect plugins